The Yellow Line (Line 2) is a metro rail line of the Delhi Metro, a rapid transit system in Delhi, India. It consists of 37 stations from Samaypur Badli in Delhi to HUDA City Centre in the neighbouring city of Gurgaon in Haryana. The Yellow line is the second line of Delhi Metro to become operational after the Red line.

It is the 3rd longest metro line on the Delhi Metro network. This line covers, North Delhi, through Central Delhi, New Delhi, South Delhi and finally the city of Gurgaon in Haryana. The Yellow line has interchanges with the Red, Blue, Violet, Pink and Magenta lines of the Delhi Metro, as well as with the Old Delhi and New Delhi railway stations of the Indian Railways. The Line also connects with the Airport Express Line at New Delhi metro station.

History 
The Vishwa Vidyalaya to Kashmere Gate section was the first underground section of Delhi Metro to be completed and became operational for public. The Prime Minister of India Mr Manmohan Singh inaugurated this 4 km stretch on 19 December 2004.

The following dates represent the dates the section opened to the public, not the private inauguration.

Stations

Train info

See also 
 Transport in Delhi
 List of Delhi Metro stations

References

External links 
 Delhi Metro Rail Corporation Ltd. (DMRC)

Railway lines opened in 2004
Delhi Metro lines
Transport in Gurgaon